Antonio Escalante (born June 3, 1985) is a Mexican professional boxer.

Amateur career
He is also a two time Golden Gloves champion.

Professional career
On September 18, 2010, Escalante lost to former champion Daniel Ponce de León in a WBO World Featherweight Title Eliminator. The Fight was televised by HBO as part of the Mosley vs. Mora undercard.

References

External links

Sportspeople from Ciudad Juárez
Boxers from Chihuahua (state)
Featherweight boxers
1985 births
Living people
Mexican male boxers
21st-century Mexican people